The La Viña Dam, officially known as the Antonio Medina Allende Dam, is an arch dam on the Los Sauces River in San Alberto Department of Córdoba Province, Argentina. Construction on the dam began in 1938 and it was completed in 1944. The  power station was later connected to the grid on 28 February 1959.

References

External links

Dams completed in 1944
Energy infrastructure completed in 1959
Dams in Argentina
Arch dams
Buildings and structures in Córdoba Province, Argentina
Hydroelectric power stations in Argentina